Stadionul Municipal is a multi-purpose stadium in Rădăuți, Romania. It is used mostly for football matches and is the home ground of Bucovina Rădăuți. The stadium holds 2,000 people.

References

External links
Stadionul Municipal. soccerway.com

Football venues in Romania
Buildings and structures in Suceava County